György  Zádor (Duka, 3 July 1799 - Pest, 17 August 1866) was a Hungarian jurist and writer. He was a member of the Hungarian Academy of Sciences and the Kisfaludy Society.

György Zádor went to schools in Pápa, Kőszeg, Győr and to the University in Pest,  where he met Mihály Vörösmarty and he started publishing using Fenyéri Gyula as his nom de plume.

References

1799 births
1866 deaths
Hungarian jurists
19th-century Hungarian writers
Members of the Hungarian Academy of Sciences